Philotheos Bryennios (7 April 1833 – November 18, 1917) was a Greek Orthodox metropolitan of Nicomedia, and the discoverer in 1873 of an important manuscript with copies of early Church documents.

Life
Born in the Tavtalos (Kurtuluş) district of Constantinople, with the secular name of Theodore, he was educated at the theological school in Halki, and at the universities of Leipzig, Munich, and Berlin. He became a professor at Halki in 1861, and then director in 1863. In 1867 he went to head the Patriarchal School in Constantinople, leaving in 1875 to attend the Old Catholic conference in Bonn, during which he was appointed metropolitan of Serres in Macedonia.  In 1877 he became Metropolitan of Nicomedia.

In 1877, he participated in a commission dealing with plundered monasteries in Moldavia and Wallachia.

Metropolitan Bryennios died in 1917 in his native Constantinople.

Works
In 1873, he discovered a manuscript in the Jerusalem Monastery of the Most Holy Sepulchre, located in the Greek quarter of Constantinople, which contained a synopsis of the Old and New Testaments arranged by St. John Chrysostom, the Epistle of Barnabas, the First Epistle of Clement to the Corinthians, the Second Epistle of Clement to the Corinthians, the Teaching of the Twelve Apostles (Didache), the spurious letter of Mary of Cassoboli, and twelve Ignatian Epistles (Five of these more generally being regarded as spurious). The letters were published in 1875, and the Didache in 1883; the letters of Clement and the Didache had notes written by Bryennios.  The discovery of the Didache was significant because writers of the early 3rd, 4th and later centuries had spoken of it, but it was presumed lost.

References

External links
 A fuller profile of the Metropolitan can be found at the Orthodox Wiki Portal: Philotheos (Bryennios) of Nicomedia
 Schaff bio of Bryennios

1833 births
1917 deaths
Clergy from Istanbul
Eastern Orthodox metropolitans
Bishops of the Ecumenical Patriarchate of Constantinople
Theological School of Halki alumni
Constantinopolitan Greeks
People from Şişli